This is a list of years in Senegal.

20th century

21st century
2000s: 2000, 2001, 2002, 2003, 2004, 2005, 2006, 2007, 2008, 
2010s: 2010, 2011, 2012, 2013, 2014, 2015, 2016, 2017, 2018, 2019
2020s: 2020, 2021, 2022, 2023, 2024, 2025, 2026, 2027, 2028, 2029

See also
 
 History of Senegal
 Timeline of Dakar
 Timeline of Saint-Louis, Senegal
 Timeline of Serer history

Bibliography

External links
 
 . Initiated by Agence universitaire de la Francophonie

 
Senegal history-related lists
Senegal
years